KBKK (105.5 FM) is a radio station broadcasting a Classic Country format. Licensed to Ball, Louisiana, United States, the station serves the Alexandria area. The station is currently owned by Stephens Media Group, through licensee SMG-Alexandria, LLC, and features programming from CNN Radio.  Its studios are located in Pineville and its transmitter is in Ball, Louisiana.

History
The station was assigned the call letters KBFU on 1998-06-01.  On 1998-07-13, the station changed its call sign to KHFX, and on 2005-02-03 to the current KBKK.  The station changed its format in December 2004 from the 1970s format to its current classic country format.

References

External links

Radio stations in Louisiana
Mass media in Alexandria, Louisiana
Classic country radio stations in the United States
Radio stations established in 1998
1998 establishments in Louisiana